Athlantis is a live album by violinist/multi-instrumentalist Eyvind Kang which was released in 2007 on  Ipecac Recordings.

Reception

The PopMatters review by Sean Murphy stated "Those who cherish the oddness in Kang (or, to invoke another of his wonderfully appropriate album titles, the “sweetness of sickness”), won't be disappointed here".

The Allmusic review by Stephen Eddins observed "The music of Athlantis defies easy pigeonholing, so identifying its attributes may be the best way to describe it. Its primary quality is an aura of dark mystery, a sense of conjuring supernatural forces. This is not the kind of piece most people would want to listen to alone in the dark".

Spin noted "Athlantis, Kang's second disc for Ipecac, is truly out there. Inspired by Renaissance-era texts, he utilizes the voices of Mike Patton and Jessika Kenney to render his chillingly phantasmal choral arrangements. Think the monolith scene from 2001 as rendered by Mr. Bungle and you're almost there."

Track listing 
All compositions by Eyvind Kang with lyrics by Giordano Bruno (tracks 2-5, 8, 11 & 12) and Marbod of Rennes (tracks 6 & 9)
 "Ministers of Friday" - 1:04
 "Vespertiliones" - 1:07 		
 "Andegavenses" - 5:09 	
 "Rabianara" - 5:35
 "Inquisitio" - 3:41	
 "Ros Vespertinus" - 5:02	
 "Conciliator" - 2:36 		
 "Iupitter" - 1:28 		
 "Repetitio" - 3:17 		
 "Lamentatio" - 3:26
 "Athlantis" - 4:49 		
 "Aquilas" - 4:33

Personnel 
Eyvind Kang - composer, director
Jessika Kenney, Mike Patton - vocals
Walter Zanetti - acoustic guitar, electric guitar
Alberto Capelli – acoustic guitar, electric guitar, sitar
Ensemble di Ottoni di Modena
Marco Catelli, Marzio Montali - trumpet
Valentino Spaggiari - trombone
Gianluigi Paganelli - bass tuba
Aldo Sisillo - conductor
Coro da Camera di Bologna
Arianna Lanci, Atsuko Koyama, Mila Ferri, Sonila Kaceli, Soon So Kyoung - soprano vocals
Alessandra Masini, Angela Troilo, Elisa Bonazzi, Laura Vicinelli, Olga Adamovich - contralti vocals
Antonio Frezzetti, Kei Nagakawa, Michele Napolitano, Sergio Giachini, Sergio Turra - tenor vocals
Enrico Volontieri, Giacomo Serra, Marcus Köhler, Simone Astolfi - bass vocals
Giovanna Giovannini - assistant choir master
Pier Paolo Scattolin - choir master

References 

2012 albums
Ipecac Recordings albums
Eyvind Kang albums